The 66th Separate Mechanized Brigade is a brigade of the Ukrainian Ground Forces formed in 2022.

History 
After Russia launched a full-scale aggression against Ukraine in February 2022, the brigade was demobilized and transferred to the Ground Forces combat composition.

Structure 
The brigade's organizational structure is as of 2022:

 66th Separate Mechanized Brigade
 Headquarters & Headquarters Company

References 

Military units and formations of the 2022 Russian invasion of Ukraine
Military units and formations of Ukraine
Military of Ukraine